Baba Sylla (born 16 June 1988) is a Malian professional footballer who plays as a forward for Championnat National 3 club Linas-Montlhéry.

References 

1988 births
Living people
Sportspeople from Bamako
Malian footballers

French footballers
French people of Malian descent
Naturalized citizens of France
Malian emigrants to France
Association football forwards
Lille OSC players
Étoile Sportive du Sahel players
ES Viry-Châtillon players
Sainte-Geneviève Sports players
US Créteil-Lusitanos players
FC Versailles 78 players
US Lusitanos Saint-Maur players
ESA Linas-Montlhéry players
Championnat National 3 players
Championnat National 2 players
Ligue 2 players
Malian expatriate footballers
French expatriate footballers
Expatriate footballers in Tunisia
Malian expatriate sportspeople in Tunisia
French expatriate sportspeople in Tunisia